Pieternella "Nelly" Cornelia Goedewaagen (1880-1953) was a Dutch painter and printmaker.

Biography
Goedewaagen was born on 16 August 1880 in Gouda. She studied at the Akademie van beeldende kunsten (Royal Academy of Art, The Hague). Her teachers included Aletta Ruijsch, and Bernard Schregel.

Goedewaagen was a member of the Arti et Amicitiae, Kunstenaarsvereniging  (Artists' association De Independents),  
 (Dordrecht) (Drawing society Pictura), and  She exhibited at De Vrouw 1813-1913 (The Woman 1813–1913). Goedewaagen's work was included in the 1939 exhibition and sale Onze Kunst van Heden (Our Art of Today) at the Rijksmuseum in Amsterdam.

Goedewaagen died on 16 February 1953 in Amsterdam.

References

External links
images of Goedewaagen's art on Galerie Wijdemeren

1880 births
1953 deaths
Dutch women artists